Paavo Lipponen's second cabinet was the 67th government of Finland. The cabinet was in office from 15 April 1999 to 17 April 2003. It was a center-left majority government, despite the center-right National Coalition Party's inclusion in the cabinet.

The Green League left the government on 31 May 2002 in protest of the government's decision to build the country's fifth nuclear power plant.

|}

1999 establishments in Finland
Lipponen, 2
2003 disestablishments in Finland
Cabinets established in 1999
Cabinets disestablished in 2003